Urvansky District is an administrative and a municipal district (raion), one of the ten in the Kabardino-Balkarian Republic, Russia. It is located in the east of the republic. Its administrative center is the town of Nartkala. As of the 2010 Census, the total population of the district was 71,782, with the population of Nartkala accounting for 44.2% of that number.

Administrative and municipal status
Within the framework of administrative divisions, Urvansky District is one of the ten in the Kabardino-Balkarian Republic and has administrative jurisdiction over one town (Nartkala) and twelve rural localities. As a municipal division, the district is incorporated as Urvansky Municipal District. The town of Nartkala is incorporated as an urban settlement and the twelve rural localities are incorporated into eleven rural settlements within the municipal district. The town of Nartkala serves as the administrative center of both the administrative and municipal district.

References

Notes

Sources

Districts of Kabardino-Balkaria
